Betty Lou is a feminine double name. Notable people with the name include:

 Betty Lou Bailey (1929–2007), American mechanical engineer
 Betty Lou Beets (1937–2000), murderer executed in Texas
 BettyLou DeCroce (born 1952), American politician from New Jersey
 Betty Lou Gerson (1914–1999), American actress
 Betty Lou Holland (born 1926), American actress
 Betty Lou Keim (1938–2010), American actress
 Betty Lou Mitchell (born 1937), American politician from Maine
 Betty Lou Varnum (1931–2021), American television personality
 Betty Lou Young (1919–2010), American writer and conservationist

See also
 Tommy Riggs and Betty Lou, radio situation comedy

Compound given names